Gennadius is a genus of snout moths. It was described by Carl Heinrich in 1956, and contains the species G. junctor. It is found in French Guiana.

References

Pyralidae genera
Phycitinae
Monotypic moth genera
Moths of South America
Taxa named by Carl Heinrich